Guidoni is an Italian surname. Notable people with the surname include:

Alessandro Guidoni
Dorival Guidoni Junior (born 1972), Brazilian retired footballer
Jean Guidoni (born 1952) French singer
Stefano Guidoni (born 1971) Italian footballer
Umberto Guidoni (born 1954), Italian astrophysicist, science writer and a former ESA astronaut,

See also
10605 Guidoni, asteroid
Guideschi
Valter Giuliani

Italian-language surnames